A mordant is a substance used to bond dyes on to a material.

Mordant also may refer to:

Substances
 Mordant, mixed acid compounds used in metalworking processes, especially etching
 Mordant, a type of sizing, a substance used for oil-based surface preparation for gilding

Fictional entities
 Mordant, a fictional setting of novel series Mordant's Need 
 Mordant, a fictional character from Mighty Morphin Power Rangers: The Movie (1995)

See also
 Mordaunt (disambiguation)
 Mordent